Rhypholophus varius  is a Palearctic species of craneflies in the family Limoniidae. It is found in  a wide range of habitats and micro habitats: in earth rich in humus, in swamps and marshes, in leaf litter and in wet spots in woods.

References

External links 
Ecology of Commanster

Limoniidae
Taxa named by Johann Wilhelm Meigen
Insects described in 1818